Jack Parsons (1906-1971) was a British film producer. He was best known for his association with Robert L. Lippert with whom he made several films.

Select filmography
Walk a Tightrope (1964)
 Do You Know This Voice? (1964)
The Earth Dies Screaming (1964)
Catacombs (1965)
The Murder Game (1965)
The Return of Mr. Moto (1965)
Curse of the Fly (1965)

References

External links

Jack Parsons at BFI

1906 births
1971 deaths
British film producers